Vouthon-Bas is a commune in the Meuse department in Grand Est in north-eastern France.
A notable native is Isabelle Romée, the mother of Joan of Arc.

See also
Communes of the Meuse department

References

Vouthonbas